Exsul is a genus of flies belonging to the family Muscidae.

The genus was erected in 1901 by Frederick Hutton for the New Zealand endemic Exsul singularis (the bat-winged fly).

The species of this genus are found only in New Zealand.

Species:

Exsul alfredoi 
Exsul singularis 
Exsul tenuis

References

Muscidae
Brachycera genera